is a Japanese former track cyclist who competed at the 1996 Summer Olympics in Atlanta, winning a bronze medal in the 1000 metres time trial.

He retired on January 15, 2019.

He now runs a ramen shop in Kashiwa city(Chiba Prefecture).

External links
Profile at DatabaseOlympics.com
1000m Time Trial at Full Olympians

1975 births
Japanese male cyclists
Cyclists at the 1996 Summer Olympics
Olympic cyclists of Japan
Living people
Olympic medalists in cycling
Asian Games medalists in cycling
Cyclists at the 1998 Asian Games
Medalists at the 1996 Summer Olympics
Olympic bronze medalists for Japan
Medalists at the 1998 Asian Games
Asian Games silver medalists for Japan
20th-century Japanese people